Meril-Prothom Alo Lifetime Achievement Award, is given by the Meril-Prothom Alo as part of its annual Meril-Prothom Alo Awards for Bangladeshi people.

Superlatives
 Oldest Winner – Shah Abdul Karim in 7th Meril-Prothom Alo Awards (aged 89)
 Youngest Winner – Firoza Begum in 13th Meril-Prothom Alo Awards (aged 56)
 Number of Female recipients – 6
 Number of Male recipients – 12

List of honourees

See also
 Meril-Prothom Alo Awards

References

External links

 
Lifetime Achievement
Lifetime achievement awards